The 1978 Fiesta Bowl was the eighth edition of the college football bowl game, played at Sun Devil Stadium in Tempe, Arizona on Monday, December 25. Part of the 1978–79 bowl game season, it matched the eighth-ranked Arkansas Razorbacks of the Southwest Conference (SWC), and the #15 UCLA Bruins from the Pacific-10 Conference (Pac-10). The game ended in a 10–10 tie before 55,227 spectators.

This was the third of four consecutive Fiesta Bowls played on Christmas Day, and was the first without a team from the Western Athletic Conference (WAC), whose champion played in the new Holiday Bowl in San Diego.

Teams

This was the first meeting between the two programs.

Arkansas

With a win over Texas A&M, Arkansas clinched a Fiesta Bowl berth. Entering the game, Arkansas had come off a 49–7 win over Texas Tech, and was 10–2 overall. The Razorbacks began the season at #2 in the AP poll, but consecutive losses at Texas and at Houston dropped the Razorbacks from SWC title contention. Ron Calcagni led the team at quarterback, while Ben Cowins was the leading rusher for the Hogs. Bruins head coach Terry Donahue said before the game that the UCLA defense would try to slow down an Arkansas rushing attack that "couldn't be stopped."

UCLA

The Bruins had been upset at Kansas in September, then won six straight to improve to 8–1. They dropped their final two games, at Oregon State, and to rival USC.

Game summary
Now televised by NBC, the game kicked off on Christmas Day shortly after 1:30 p.m. MST. The Peach Bowl was played earlier in the day on CBS. The NBC telecast was most noted for sideline reporter Mike Haffner inadvertently capturing on his live microphone a two‐word expletive uttered by Terry Donahue who was voicing his disapproval over a Bruins interception being nullified due to a penalty. Ironically Haffner and Donohue were roommates at UCLA.

After a scoreless first quarter, Jim Howard sacked UCLA quarterback Steve Bukich, who fumbled, and Arkansas recovered at the UCLA 37. Roland Sales punched it in from four yards out to give the Hogs a 7–0 advantage. The Razorbacks added a field goal from Ish Ordonez, stretching the lead to ten points at halftime.

UCLA took the second half kickoff and drove it for a field goal from Peter Boermaester. Down 10–3, UCLA was set to field a Razorback punt in the fourth quarter. An interference penalty added yardage, giving the Bruins the football at midfield. Severne Reece caught a Bukich pass at the Arkansas 14, and Bukich ran it in on the following play. The Bruins opted not to attempt a two-point conversion, made the kick, and the game was tied at 10–10 with 8:32 remaining. Neither team could get the ball past midfield again, and the tie stood.

Scoring

Statistics
{| class=wikitable style="text-align:center"
! Statistics !! Arkansas  !! UCLA
|-
| First Downs || 19 || 14
|-
| Yards Rushing|| 51–200 || 55–255
|-
| Yards Passing || 78 || 61
|-
| Passing || 13–24–2 || 4–11–2
|-
| Return Yards || 72 || 35
|-
| Total Offense || 75–278 || 66–316
|-
|Punts–Average ||8–37|| 6–41
|-
|Fumbles–Lost ||2–0|| 2–1
|-
|Turnovers||2||3 
|-
|Penalties–Yards ||4–55|| 7–67
|}

References

External links
Fiesta Bowl – December 25, 1978

Fiesta Bowl
Fiesta Bowl
Arkansas Razorbacks football bowl games
UCLA Bruins football bowl games
December 1978 sports events in the United States
1978 in sports in Arizona